Lahijan County is in Gilan province, Iran. The capital of the county is the city of Lahijan. At the 2006 census, the county's population was 161,491 in 48,075 households. The following census in 2011 counted 168,829 people in 55,174 households. At the 2016 census, the county's population was 167,544 in 58,378 households.

Administrative divisions

The population history of Lahijan County's administrative divisions over three consecutive censuses is shown in the following table. The latest census shows two districts, seven rural districts, and two cities.

References

 

Counties of Gilan Province